The athletics competition at the 1949 Summer International University Sports Week was held in Merano, Italy, in early September.

Medal summary

Men

Women

Medal table

References
World Student Games (Pre-Universiade) - GBR Athletics 

Athletics at the Summer Universiade
1949 Summer International University Sports Week
Uni
International athletics competitions hosted by Italy
1949 in Italian sport